Cork City Football Club was an Irish association football club based in Cork. After replacing Cork F.C., they played in the League of Ireland between 1938 and 1940.  The club folded in 1940 and were in turn replaced in the League of Ireland by a new club, Cork United.

History

Foundation
Shortly after Cork F.C. folded, an emergency meeting was held to form a new club. Two potential names were proposed – Cork Celtic and Cork City. During the 1920s both of these names had been used by teams playing in the Munster Senior League. A team named Cork City also finished as Munster Senior Cup runners up in 1924–25. Initially, however, the Cork F.C. name was retained as the new club were give permission to complete Cork F.C.'s fixtures from the 1937–38 League of Ireland season. They eventually finished second last in the league. New colours were also adopted – a strange combination of red, yellow and black hooped shirts.

1938–39
By 1938–39 the new club had settled on the Cork City F.C. name. The club also managed to recruit some professional players including Hugh Connolly, Willie Ross, Jim Foley, Jimmy Turnbull and Tom Davis. The club also enjoyed some moderate success. They reached the final of the Dublin City Cup. In the semi-final on 31 August 1938 they defeated Shamrock Rovers 7–0, a result which remains Rovers' biggest ever defeat. However, in the final Cork City lost 6–0 to St James's Gate. They also won the 1938–39 Munster Senior Cup, defeating Limerick 4–0 in the final at The Mardyke with Turnbull scoring a hat-trick in the final.

1939–40 
For the 1939–40 season Cork City managed to recruit two former Cork F.C. players, Owen Madden and Billy Millar, as well as two emerging players, Jackie O'Driscoll and Billy O'Neill. However it later emerged that Billy Millar had signed for Cork City while he was still technically contracted to Shelbourne and the club were subsequently fined by the Football Association of Ireland. Like Cork F.C. a few seasons earlier, Cork City began to struggle to raise travel costs for away games in Dublin and the fine received over Millar did not help. Then on 21 January, Cork City played Shelbourne and were unable to pay the visitors their 20% share of the gate money. On Sunday, 28 January 1940 at The Mardyke, Cork City played what transpired to be the last match in its short history. City defeated Bohemians 2–1 with O’Neill scoring both goals. Under threat of suspension from the league, Cork City were dissolved on 13 February 1940. However history repeated itself and a new club, Cork United, was immediately formed and they were given permission to complete Cork City's league fixtures.

Notable former players

Dual Ireland internationals
   Tom Davis
   Owen Madden
   Jackie O'Driscoll

Ireland (FAI) internationals

Ireland (IFA) internationals
  Billy Millar

Goalscorers
  Billy O'Neill (8) – 1938–39 
  Jimmy Turnbull (8) – 1938–39; scored hat-trick in Munster Senior Cup final.

Honours
Munster Senior Cup
Winners: 1938–39 
Dublin City Cup
Runners-up: 1938–39

See also
League of Ireland in Cork city

References

 
Association football clubs in County Cork
Defunct League of Ireland clubs
Association football clubs disestablished in 1940
1940 disestablishments in Ireland
Association football clubs established in 1938
1938 establishments in Ireland
Association football clubs in Cork (city)